Amarantite is an amaranth-red to brownish mineral with the general formula of Fe3+2O(SO4)2·7H2O or Fe3+SO4(OH)·3H2O.  

The name comes from the Greek word αμάραντος which means amaranth, an imaginary undying red flower, in allusion to its color. 

Amarantite is triclinic, which means crystallographically, it has only one symmetry fold. It must be rotated 360 degrees to be exactly the same. Due to it being triclinic it falls into the biaxial optical class, the axis degrees do not equal 90 degrees and the sides of each axis are not the same length. Amarantite is anisotropic, which means, the velocity of light varies with crystallographic direction, and there is more than one refractive index. 

Amarantite is a very rare mineral and can only be found in a couple of places such as Carocoles, Chile. Although it is a source of iron, there is not enough amarantite to be mined for iron. However, when found in crystal form its red orange color gives it value as a collectors item.

References

Palache, C., Berman, H., & Frondel, C. (1951), The System of Mineralogy of James Dwight Dana and Edward Salisbury Dana, Yale University 1837-1892, Volume II. John Wiley and Sons, Inc., New York, 7th edition, revised and enlarged, 1124 pp.: 611-613.

Iron(III) minerals
Sulfate minerals
Triclinic minerals
Minerals in space group 2